The TOZ-194 is a 12 gauge, pump-action shotgun manufactured by the Tula Arms Plant.

History 
In early 1990s was designed a pump-action shotgun based on TOZ-87. In late 1994 Tula Arms Plant made first TOZ-94.

Later, the production of second version (TOZ-194) has started, and since then it has gained a certain popularity within civilian shooters in Russia itself and in Europe, and is reported to be in use with some Russian Security forces.

The TOZ-194 is a conventional pump-action shotgun that feeds from a 7-rounds tube and chambers 70 mm shotgun shells ("Standard" 2" 12-gauge, therefore the use of 76 mm (3 inches) "Magnum" shells is strongly counterindicated). Its main feature is its 540 mm (21.2 inches approx.) barrel, which is oddly long for a combat shotgun; this was done to reach an overall length of 805 mm (31.6 inches approx.) which makes it legal for civilian ownership in Russia.

Variants

 TOZ-94 (ТОЗ-94) - first model with four round magazine
 TOZ-194 (ТОЗ-194) - second model. Four variants of the TOZ-194 shotgun are available: the TOZ-194M with sole pistol grip; the TOZ-194-01M with pistol grip and upfolding metal stock, and muzzle adapters available for tactical applications; the TOZ-194-02M and TOZ-194-03M, both with standard fixed stock, the latter one also available with muzzle adapter.

Users 

  - TOZ-94 and TOZ-194-02 shotguns (with non-detachable fixed shoulder stocks) are allowed as civilian hunting weapon
  - is allowed as civilian hunting weapon

Notes

External links
Tulsky oruzheiny zavod (TOZ - Tula Armory)
(TOZ-194 shotgun page in English on the manufacturer's website)
 M. R. Popenker. TOZ-194 (Russia) / "Modern Firearms"

Pump-action shotguns
Shotguns of Russia
Tula Arms Plant products
TsNIITochMash products